Gastaldi is a surname. Notable people with the surname include:

Andrea Gastaldi (1826–1889), Italian painter
Bartolomeo Gastaldi (1818–1879), Italian geologist and palæontologist
Ernesto Gastaldi (born 1934), Italian screenwriter
Giacomo Gastaldi (c. 1500–1566), Italian cartographer, astronomer and engineer
Giantommaso Gastaldi (1597–1655), Italian Roman Catholic bishop 
Girolamo Gastaldi (1616–1685), Italian Roman Catholic cardinal
Nicol Gastaldi (born 1990), Argentine alpine skiers
Román Gastaldi (born 1989), Argentine decathlete
Sebastiano Gastaldi (born 1991), Argentine alpine skier
Valeria Gastaldi (born 1981), Argentine singer

See also 
Gastaldi synthesis, method for the organic synthesis of pyrazine